Sarah Poyntz was an Irish journalist and author.  She is best known for her contributions over 24 years to Country Diary describing The Burren, some of which were subsequently published in book form.

Born in New Ross in 1926 she was educated at Loreto Abbey in County Wexford and University College Dublin (UCD).  She initially worked as a teacher in England, and was appointed Head of the English Department at the Perse School for Girls in Cambridge, but took early retirement due to ill health.  In 1986 she moved to Ballyvaughan and in 1987 she began writing for Country Diary.  In 2006 she wrote a book on the villages of The Burren.

She retired from writing in December 2010, at the age of 84. She died on 14 September 2020.

References

1926 births
2020 deaths
Alumni of University College Dublin
Writers from County Wexford
Irish women journalists
The Guardian journalists
People from Ballyvaughan